Jacques Rémy can refer to:

 Jacques Rémy (field hockey) (born 1935), a Belgian Olympic hockey player
 Jacques Rémy (footballer) (born 1972), a French footballer
 Jacques Rémy (writer) (1911-1981), a French writer